George Walters may refer to:

George Walters (VC) (1829–1872), English recipient of the Victoria Cross
George Walters (footballer) (1939–2015), Scottish footballer
George Walters (MP) for Barnstaple

See also
George Walter (disambiguation)

George Waters (disambiguation)